The year 1644 AD in science and technology involved some significant events.

Mathematics
 The Basel problem is posed by Pietro Mengoli, and will puzzle mathematicians until solved by Leonhard Euler in 1735.

Technology
 Jacob van Eyck collaborated with the bellfounding duo Pieter and François Hemony to create the first tuned carillon in Zutphen.

Publications
 Jan Baptist van Helmont publishes Dageraad ofte Nieuwe Opkomst der Geneeskunst ("Daybreak, or the New Rise of Medicine").

Births
 25 September – Ole Rømer, Danish astronomer who makes the first quantitative measurements of the speed of light (died 1710)

Deaths
 2 July – William Gascoigne, English scientist (born 1610)
 30 December – Jan Baptist van Helmont, Flemish chemist (born 1580)

References

 
17th century in science
1640s in science